Paralympic powerlifting competitions at the 2019 Parapan American Games in Lima were held from August 29 to 31 at the VIDENA Sports Center 2.

Medal table

Medalists

Men's event

Women's event

See also
Weightlifting at the 2019 Pan American Games

References

2019 Parapan American Games